Birdwood is a historic home located on the grounds of the University of Virginia's Birdwood Golf Course near Charlottesville, Albemarle County, Virginia.  The documented history of what would come to be known as Birdwood began in the early 18th century, when David Lewis acquired the property in a 3,000 acre land grant from the Crown. Four other owners purchased several hundred acres of this grant over the next 150 years, including John Dabney in 1759, John Kerr in 1793, Hoare Browse Trist in 1800, and William Garth in 1810.

Garth built the Birdwood pavilion and four surrounding dependencies between 1819 and 1830; the entrance drive was also built at that time. It has been suggested that Thomas Jefferson's workmen may have assisted with the construction of the buildings due to the shared classical characteristics of the Birdwood structures and the contemporaneous University of Virginia pavilions. The farm was likely a thriving plantation, as Garth shared an interest in scientific agricultural practices with the local elite farming community. Garth produced tobacco, com, wheat, wool, and butter with the help of 52 enslaved workers by 1850. The plantation was the site of horse races run by the Birdwood Jockey Club. During the Civil War, it was also the subject of a raid by General Custer in 1865.

Samuel Buck purchased the Birdwood property in 1879. The Bucks only owned the property for eleven years, but they appeared to have been active farmers. A description of the property at that time includes a mention of quarters for enslaved workers, a gardener's cottage, orchards, berry patches, a roof cistern, wine cellar, apple room, a multitude of trees representing different geographies of the U.S., a poultry yard, walnut trees, and a stocked fish pond. Buck's ownership of the property was followed by William Chamberlain's in 1891, although no information has come to light about his activities. Charles Edgar purchased Birdwood in 1903, and constructed a new underground piping system to provide water to the house and also the large building addition on the southern side of the pavilion.

Hollis Rinehart, Birdwood owner from 1909 to 1921, undertook many alterations to the property during his tenure to create the country estate character that still remains. Rinehart was a wealthy businessman and a member of the university's Board of Visitors. His alterations of the property included the construction of the stone shed and the water tower. He also installed the ornamental gardens that were later photographed by Rufus Holsinger in 1917–1918.

Holsinger's photographs documented the formal entry drive and looped access at the pavilion's front portico; the gardens; swimming pool and pool pavilion; garden pergola; garden statuary, urns, and fountain; and views into the surrounding landscape. By that time, many of the trees surrounding the buildings and gardens were mature, suggesting that previous owners had planted them. These include the tree allee along the entrance drive and the pecan trees south of the pavilion.

The year 1921 ushered in a new owner and additional structures. Henry Fonda constructed the brick barn and wood garage, suggesting that the property was still used for active farming and that its owner likely owned a car. James De Witt purchased the core property in 1936, although by this time the Birdwood land holdings reduced to 560 acres.

Cornelius Walworth Middleton and Isabelle Hoxie Middleton purchased Birdwood Farm in 1940 and undertook renovations to the main pavilion and also constructed Middleton House, the Caretaker's Cottage, several lakes, and a show barn for their Hereford cattle. Richard Hoxie Middleton and Martha Haugh Middleton took over ownership after the passing of CW Middleton and raised their four boys on the farm - Richard, Robert, John and William.

In 1967, the University of Virginia purchased the first of several portions of the Birdwood property. The university built a golf course at Birdwood with a separate entry drive and features related to the sport, thus maintaining the open quality of the former agricultural fields. Several of the buildings near the mansion are currently used for housing.

Birdwood was added to the National Register of Historic Places in 2003.

Extant Historic Features:

Birdwood Pavilion, c. 1819-1830 
Slave Quarters, c. 1819-1830 
Ice House, c. 1830 
Northwest Storage Building, c. 1830 Southeast Storage Building, c 1819-1830 Southwest Storage Building, c. 1819-1830 Agricultural Landscape 
Approach Drive with Circle near Pavilion Pavilion Addition 
Trees in Front Lawn 
Allee of Trees along Approach Drive Pecan Trees in Rear Lawn 
Ornamental Gardens 
Water Tower, c. 1909 
Stone Shed, C. 1909 
Hedges near Front Portico 
Marble Fountain 
Wood Garage, c. 1920 
Barn, c. 1925 
Silo, c. 1930 
Stone Garage, c. 1940 
Middleton House, c. 1940 
Caretaker Cottage, 1945 
Lake

References

External links
 Birdwood Ice House, U.S. Route 250 West, Charlottesville, Charlottesville, VA at the Historic American Buildings Survey (HABS)
 Watertower at Birdwood Pavilion, Ivy Road off of U.S. Route 250 West, Charlottesville, Charlottesville, VA at HABS

Houses on the National Register of Historic Places in Virginia
Colonial Revival architecture in Virginia
Houses completed in 1830
Houses in Albemarle County, Virginia
National Register of Historic Places in Albemarle County, Virginia
Historic American Buildings Survey in Virginia
1830 establishments in Virginia